Petit Meslier is a rare white wine grape that is a minor component of some Champagne blends. It is valued for its ability to retain acidity even in hot vintages. In the very rare cases where it is not blended, it makes crisp wines tasting of apples. The Traminer family of grapes can be difficult to grow, with poor disease resistance and low yields.

History and pedigree
DNA fingerprinting has shown that like Aubin blanc, Petit Meslier is the result of a cross between Gouais blanc and Savagnin. Gouais blanc is a parent of Chardonnay and Aubin vert among others, and Savagnin is common in Jura wine (including Vin jaune) and is a variety in the Traminer family which also includes Gewürztraminer. The Swiss variety Amigne also has a parent-offspring relationship with Petit Meslier.

Australia
Levrier Wines by Jo Irvine believe that their Meslier Brut Rosé is the only single varietal Meslier Rosé produced in the world. Grapes are sourced from a single vineyard from the Adelaide Hills in South Australia.

France
There are just 20 hectares in France. Duval-Leroy have made a single varietal champagne, the Authentis Petit Meslier, which was criticised by Decanter for over-oaking.
Champagne Moutard use 1/6th of Petit Meslier in their unique "Cuvée Six Cépages" : Chardonnay, Pinot Noir, Pinot Meunier, Pinot Blanc, Arbane and Petit Meslier.

Champagne Laherte Frères has some in its cuvée "Les 7" along with Chardonnay, Pinot Noir, Pinot Blanc, Pinot Meunier, Arbanne and Fromenteau.

L. Aubry Fils  includes Petit Meslier as a component of the "Le Nombre d'Or Sablé Blanc des Blancs Brut Campanae Veteres Vites" bottling as well as part of the standard Brut bottling.

Synonyms
Arbonne, Barnay, Bernais, Bernet, Co De France, Crene, Feuille D'Ozerolle, Hennequin, Lepine, Maille, Maye, Melie, Melie Blanc, Melier, Meslier De Champagne, Meslier Dore, Meslier Petit A Queue Rouge, Meslier Vert, Mornain Blanc, Orbois, Petit Meslier, Petit Meslier A Queue Rouge, Petit Meslier Dore, Queue Rouge, Saint Lye

See also
 Arbane
 Fromenteau gris
Remuage

References

White wine grape varieties
Champagne (wine)